Chris Steinmetz (born 1966) is a record producer and engineer living in Chicago.  He is president of Stonecutter Records.

Biography

Early life

Chris Steinmetz was born in 1966 to Kenneth and Virginia Steinmetz in Barrington, Illinois.  He began playing guitar at age 12 and played in bands throughout high school.  It was during this time that Steinmetz first became interested in audio engineering.  While playing a show one night, he was struck by the lower quality of his band's sound compared to the headliners.  Despite his newfound interest in audio, Steinmetz entered the University of Utah majoring in biomedical engineering upon graduating high school.  However, the call to music proved too strong and a year later Steinmetz dropped out and moved to Los Angeles to pursue a career in the recording industry.

Recording career
Steinmetz career in LA took off quickly as he spent his first three sessions working with Paul Simon, John Denver, and David Lee Roth.  Within a year, engineer Michael Wagener took notice of Steinmetz and hired him to engineer many classic 80s hard rock albums for his label.  During his time in LA, Steinmetz also did freelance work for many other bands as well as for some feature films.

In 1996, Steinmetz moved back to his native Chicago to be closer to family.  He began freelancing at Chicago Recording Company, Chicago Trax, and Terry Fryer Music.  Provided with access to Chicago's growing rap music scene, Steinmetz' normal clientele began to shift from hard rock to hip hop.  Between 2004 and 2006 six alone, he received credits on albums by Kanye West, Twista, Lil Jon, Usher, E-dub, and Jin with all six going platinum or gold.  During this time, Steinmetz also helped to pioneer the field of music mixing in 5.1.

Stonecutter Records
Chris Steinmetz created his own label, Stonecutter Records, in 2006 out of the desire to "advance [artists] to the next level in their careers and get them the exposure they deserve."  The label's first project, Acoustic Chicago, is a compilation of 13 Chicago artists and features their music in an acoustic format to highlight songwriting ability.

Stonecutter Recording Studios
In 2012, Steinmetz opened Stonecutter Recording Studios. Located in the south loop of Chicago, it is a recording facility providing recording, mixing, mastering, marketing and production.

Partial discography

References

1966 births
Living people